The JT 42BW is a class of four axle Bo'Bo' diesel electric locomotives manufactured by Alstom's Meinfesa plant in Spain for Israel Railways (IR). The locomotives were the primary passenger locomotive unit used by IR through the 2000s.

Description

The locomotives are of the Prima type, produced at Alstom's plant in Valencia, Spain in collaboration with GM-EMD; the locomotives use EMD traction equipment and an EMD 710 engine. They were acquired to provide additional passenger services created as a result of investment in the 1990s which included the re-opening of several lines to passenger traffic. The locomotives are used to propel push-pull trains - a typical formation (2009) uses one locomotive, five double deck coaches, and a double deck driving trailer; the vehicles were the main passenger locomotive of IR, and half of its locomotive fleet (2007).

The locomotives were ordered in several batches between 1996 and 2006, the second batch of ten units allowed the 6 axle JT 42CW freight locomotives to return to their intended duties after they were transferred to passenger work due to lack of locomotives.

Two units, numbers 739 and 741 were rebuilt after being involved in accidents at Ahuzam and Beit Yehoshua.

In 2011 IR ordered 24 four axle Bo'Bo' Euro 3000 AC locomotives from Alstom Valencia successor company Vossloh España; these locomotives inherit some design features from the JT42BW, including the use of an EMD 710 engine, though unlike the JT42BW the locomotives use AC motors controlled by IGBT electronics.

See also
Israel Railways JT 42CW, contemporary freight locomotives from the same manufacturer

References

Data

External links

, article on JT42BW and EMD G12 of IR

Alstom Prima diesel locomotives
Diesel-electric locomotives of Israel
Macosa/Meinfesa/Vossloh Espana locomotives
Standard gauge locomotives of Israel
Railway locomotives introduced in 1996